Providence St. Peter Hospital, located in the Lilly Road Medical District of Olympia, Washington is Providence Health & Services’s second largest Washington state hospital. Providence St. Peter features 390 beds in the medical/surgical tower with 42 private rooms in the emergency department (including a four-bed locked mental health evaluation unit), 18 beds in the Psychiatry Building, and 42 beds in the Critical Care Unit. This facility is a non-profit teaching hospital founded by the Sisters of Providence in 1887. Providence St. Peter Hospital offers comprehensive medical, surgical and behavioral health services.

Departments and services 

Regional Cancer Center
Chemical Dependency Center (Off Campus)
Diagnostic Imaging
Emergency Department- A Level III trauma center
Family Birth Center (Located in the Lower Level)
Regional Heart Program
Neuroscience Center
Neurosurgery Clinic
Orthopaedic Healing Center
Outpatient Surgery
Pediatrics
Physical Medicine and Rehabilitation (Located in the Emilie Gamelin Pavilion)
Psychiatry Services
Senior Services
Sexual Assault Clinic
Tattoo removal services
Women's Services
Superior Medical/Renal

Medical library 
Providence St. Peter Hospital's medical library is open for the use of medical staff, residents, medical students, hospital employees, and the general public. The library is located on the Lower Level of the Medical/Surgical Tower but has been closed since the outbreak of COVID-19 in 2020.

Wifi internet service is available in the hospital for patients and visitors with their own laptops and other wireless devices.

References

External links
Providence St. Peter Hospital Website

Catholic hospitals in North America
St. Peter
Buildings and structures in Olympia, Washington
Hospitals established in 1887
Teaching hospitals in Washington (state)